iCab is a web browser for Mac OS by Alexander Clauss, derived from Crystal Atari Browser (CAB) for Atari TOS compatible computers. It was one of the few browsers still updated for the classic Mac OS prior to that version being discontinued after version 3.0.5 in 2008; Classilla was the last browser that was maintained for that OS but it was discontinued in 2021.

The downloadable product is fully functional, but is nagware—periodically displaying a dialog box asking the user to register the product, and upgrade to the "Pro" version.

Versions 

iCab 2.9.9 supports both 68k and PowerPC Macintosh systems running System 7.5 through Mac OS 9.2.2.  While no longer maintained, iCab 2.9.9 is still available for download and registration.

iCab 2.9.8 runs natively on early versions of Mac OS X, but Mac OS X compatible versions of iCab 2.x are no longer officially available for download.

iCab 3.x can run on PowerPC systems running Mac OS 8.5 through Mac OS 9.2.2, or PowerPC or Intel systems running Mac OS X 10.1 or later.  iCab 3 was last updated in January 2008.

iCab 4 was rewritten to use the Cocoa API and the WebKit rendering engine.  It can run on PowerPC or Intel systems running Mac OS 10.3.9 or later.

iCab 5 was released on June 12, 2012.  It runs on Mac OS 10.5 or later.

iCab 6 was rewritten using the new technologies in macOS Big Sur and released on October 31, 2020.  It runs on macOS 10.13 or later.

History 

The first versions of iCab were criticized for not supporting CSS and DOM. iCab 3 introduced improved rendering capabilities, including support for CSS2 and Unicode (via the ATSUI toolkit). iCab 4 switched to WebKit for its rendering engine, giving it the same rendering abilities as Apple's Safari browser.

On 7 June 2009, iCab 4.6, using the WebKit rendering engine, became the first desktop browser released to display a score of 100/100 and pass the Acid3 test. Apple's Safari 4 browser was released one day later and has been officially credited as being the first official release browser to pass the Acid3 test with a score of 100/100.

Features 

iCab features a filter manager which allows users to avoid downloading advertisements and other content. Currently iCab comes with two filters (advertisements and video). Other kinds of filters add features, such as the YouTube video filter which adds a download link on all YouTube page views.

iCab has features for website developers, including an HTML validity checker, an automatic page refresh option, a Web Inspector, DOM Inspector, JavaScript debugger, and a Console.  iCab's "Automatic Update" option, for any page it is rendering directly from the local hard disk, will automatically reload the page when changes are saved to disk. The HTML syntax validity checker displays a smiley face in the Status Bar and also, optionally, in the Toolbar. Clicking on the smiley will bring up a list of any errors on the page, as will "Error Report" from the Tools menu.  Double clicking on an error will display the page source, with the offending syntax highlighted. The HTML syntax validator was first seen in the same author's earlier web browser, CAB.

iCab's Download manager allows the user to start, stop, resume and review downloads.  It maintains a download history, and supports downloading of an individual page, or a whole site (crawling) with many user-selectable crawl-constraint options.  It can save as portable web archives (a ZIP archive containing HTML, images and other files), or as individual files on the local hard drive.

iCab also contains the following features:

 Tabbed browsing.
 Javascript and CSS2 support.
 Multiple language support, including Arabic on older Macs (cannot display UTF-16 pages).
 Filtering:
 Filtering out of images and plugin content (e.g. ads).
 Adjust rendering, network, JavaScript, and cookies settings for individual sites or types of pages.
 Kiosk mode: full-screen display and access controls.
 Acid2 test compliance.
 Configurable print dialog.
 History window which can sort by title, last access date, or URL.
 Hotlist (bookmark) mechanism which can automatically or manually check for updates to bookmarked sites.
 Reload a single image on a page without needing to reload the whole page.
 Disable web "annoyances" such as animated GIFs and embedded sound files.
 User agent spoofing (i.e. pretending to be another browser).
 Support for sessions (i.e. saving and then loading all open windows and tabs).
 Add any query (e.g., search engine, Wikipedia) to the toolbar search widget by point-and-click.

See also 
 List of web browsers
 Comparison of web browsers
 InScript (JavaScript engine)

References

External links 
 
 "Thoughts on the Memory Efficiency of iCab and Programming in the 80s" by John A. Ardelli

1999 software
Macintosh web browsers
MacOS web browsers
News aggregator software
Software based on WebKit